Mandaru was according to the Assyrian King List (AKL) the sixth Assyrian monarch, ruling in Assyria's early period, though he is not attested in any known contemporary artefacts. He is listed among the "seventeen kings who lived in tents" within the Mesopotamian Chronicles. Mandaru is in the lists preceded by Harharu, and succeeded by Imsu.

See also

 Timeline of the Assyrian Empire
 Early Period of Assyria
 List of Assyrian kings
 Assyrian continuity
 Assyria

References

24th-century BC Assyrian kings